Count József Zichy de Zich et Vásonkeő (13 November 1841 – 11 November 1924) was a Hungarian politician, who served as Minister of Agriculture, Industry and Trade between 1872 and 1874 and as Minister of Public Works and Transport from 1873 to 1875. He was the first governor of Fiume since 1870.

References
 Magyar Életrajzi Lexikon

1841 births
1924 deaths
Politicians from Bratislava
Jozsef, Zichy
Deák Party politicians
Agriculture ministers of Hungary
Public Works and Transport ministers of Hungary
19th-century Hungarian politicians
Lord-lieutenants of a county in Hungarian Kingdom